PEMCO Insurance is a personal-lines mutual insurance company based in Seattle, Washington that serves only Washington and Oregon residents.

History
In 1936, Seattle school teacher Robert J. Handy took advantage of the newly legalized “credit union” concept to found Seattle Teachers Credit Union. Handy started the credit union with $5 in capital. Out of that enterprise grew a group of seven different but related companies, including PEMCO Insurance.

PEMCO has grown from premiums of $8,500 in 1949 to nearly $500 million in 2021.

Today, PEMCO is the Northwest’s largest local personal-lines insurer, providing auto, home, boat and umbrella coverage to the general public.

The current president and CEO of PEMCO Insurance is Stan W. McNaughton. He is the son of Stanley O. McNaughton, who was president from 1970 until his death in 1998.

PEMCO serves customers from its Seattle headquarters in the South Lake Union tech district, and from a regional office in Spokane.

Awards

PEMCO has earned several service and marketing-campaign awards in recent years, including:

 J.D. Power ranked PEMCO Insurance "highest in customer satisfaction among auto Insurers in the Northwest region," a five-state area, each year from 2013-2019.
 “Best Announcer," “Best Client Campaign,” “Best of Show” and others at the Soundies, sponsored by the Puget Sound Radio Broadcasters Association, in 2008, 2009 and 2010.
 Several showcase awards including the coveted SAMMY "Best of Show" top honor for the TV ad featuring "Northwest Profile #4: 4-Way Stop, You Go. No You Go. No You Go. Guy" awarded by the Insurance Marketing and Communications Association in 2009 and 2010.

References

Virgin, Bill. "Nimble PEMCO looks to grow", The Seattle Post-Intelligencer, June 24, 2005.
Ebnet, Matthew "Longtime PEMCO Chief, 76, Beloved By Workers", The Seattle Times, January 20, 1998.
J.D. Power. “Premium Increases Become Sticking Point for U.S. Auto Insurance Customers, J.D. Power Finds,” June 19, 2017.
Puget Sound Radio Broadcasters Association. “2010 Soundie Award Winners,” May 2010.
Insurance Marketing and Communications Association. “PEMCO wins SAMMY Award at 52nd annual awards,” July 26, 2010.

External links
 PEMCO's Official Website
 Robert J. Handy

Financial services companies established in 1949
Companies based in Seattle
Insurance companies of the United States
Mutual insurance companies
Mutual insurance companies of the United States
1949 establishments in the United States
American companies established in 1949